Hong Gildong jeon (Hangul: 홍길동전; hanja: 洪吉童傳) is a Korean novel, often translated as The Biography of Hong Gildong, written during the Joseon Dynasty. Hong Gildong, an illegitimate son of a nobleman and his lowborn concubine, is the main character of the story. Gifted with supreme intelligence and supernatural abilities, he steals from rich and corrupt aristocrats, which has drawn him comparisons to famous bandits like the English folk hero Robin Hood and Australia’s Ned Kelly.  Historical sources point to the existence of a bandit named Hong Gildong  who was arrested in 1500, but the historical inspiration for the character was the Korean bandit and folk hero Im Kkeokjeong, who lived in the early 16th century.
  
The character of Hong Gildong has become a mainstay of Korean culture and literature. In Korea today, Hong Gildong is a common placeholder name, similar to John Doe in the United States.  Charles Montgomery of the website Korean Literature in Translation explains, “In Korean literature Hong Gildong is legion. He is a fixture from one of the most important early novels in Hangul – he is the first truly ‘Korean’ main character.” Professor Minsoo Kang writes in the foreword to his translation, “The Story of Hong Gildong is arguably the single most important work of classic (i.e., premodern) prose fiction of Korea, in terms of not only its literary achievement but also of its influence on the larger culture.” NPR’s Ari Shapiro explained on Fresh Air, "Sometimes, a single character can help define a country's sense of self. Here in the U.S., you might think of Jay Gatsby in The Great Gatsby or Superman. In North and South Korea, it's Hong Gildong.”

Plot
Various versions of Hong Gildong jeon exist, each including different details but following the same skeleton and timeline. The story is usually divided into three equal parts, each occurring in different settings.
  
The first part is set in the residence of the Hong Family. After waking from an auspicious dream, the High Minister, Hong Mo, lies with a lowborn maid, who conceives Hong Gildong. The story then shifts to Gildong’s childhood where he masters his physical, mental, and magical abilities. The first part concludes with Hong Gildong stopping an assassin’s attempt on his life and then leaving the Hong residence, unsatisfied with his status as a secondary son.

In the second part, Hong Gildong becomes the leader of a band of outlaws whom he names Hwalbindang (“league of those who help the impoverished”). Gildong and his band steal from locations where wealth is held throughout the country, like storehouses and temples. As his robberies become bolder and more frequent, he draws the attention of the King and ultimately ends up leaving the country in self-imposed exile.

The third part takes place in the country of Yul. Hong Gildong starts over with the Hwalbindang at the island of Jae and then overthrows the King of Yul to become King. He rules as a benevolent king and begins his own family at Yul, in which he treats his secondary and primary sons equally.

Literary context, themes and history
Authorship of the novel is generally attributed to Heo Gyun (허균), a radical intellectual who long dreamed of changing Korea into a fair society with less strict class hierarchies. The first attribution to Heo Gyun is from the writings of Yi Sik (1584–1647), his former student. Furthermore, Heo Gyun is said to be the author because of his radical ideas of political revolution, which are projected in Hong Gildong’s journey from secondary son to king. It is believed Heo Gyun wrote the book during the late 16th or early 17th century.

However, in recent years, emerging scholarship has contradicted previously accepted theories on the authorship of Hong Gildong jeon. In a 2013 article in Azalea: Journal of Korean Literature & Culture, Minsoo Kang argues that the claim for Heo Gyun as author of the novel is based on flawed and biased scholarship. He proposes instead that the extant version of the novel was written around the mid-19th century, or not long before that, "by an anonymous writer of secondary or commoner status."

Hong Gildong is often viewed as a reflection of its time. Depending on the Heo Gyun authorship model or the one that Kang proposes, this perspective differs. Kang suggests that peace and prosperity in 18th century Korea under the rule of Yeongjo and Jeonjo allowed for increased social mobility and literacy. This led to the development of a market for popular fiction, and Hong Gildong jeon is exemplary of these kinds of novels.

There are more than 34 existing manuscripts of Hong Gildong jeon. Scholars are uncertain which, if any, is the original manuscript, but some evidence suggests that the pilsa 89 manuscript is the oldest surviving version.

Cultural legacy
In addition to its reputation as a literary work, Hong Gildong jeon has become widely known in Korean culture through various adaptations across different mediums. The story has inspired films, TV shows, comics, literary re-tellings, and video games, and continues to be frequently adapted. Korean rapper G-Dragon makes several references to him in his lyrics. For example in “Knock Out,” he says, “They call me Hong Gildong.” There is a Hong Gildong theme park in Jangseong County,  traditionally thought to be the character’s birthplace, and a Hong Gildong festival is held in Jangseong each year.

Adaptations
 Shin Dong-wu created the South Korean Hong Gildong comic books in the 1960s, creating the iconic image of the hero in a blue shirt and yellow hat.
 The story was adapted into a South Korean animated feature film of the same name in 1967.
 A South Korean animated feature film sequel named Hong Gil-dong Janggun (홍길동 장군, "General Hong Gildong") followed in 1969.
 The South Korean 1983 animated feature film Uju Jeonsa Hong Gil-dong (우주전사 홍길동, "Space Soldier Hong Gil dong") takes the character into a science fiction setting.
 A North Korean martial arts film, Hong Kil Dong, was released in 1986, in which he fights against Japanese ninjas.
 A South Korean action video game adaption, Hong Kil Dong, was released for Sega Master System and MSX computers in 1990 by Clover.
 A South Korean role-playing video game, Hong Gil-dong jeon (홍길동전), was released for IBM compatible computers in 1993 by A+.
 A sequel to the 1993 game, the interactive movie Hong Gil-dong jeon 2 (홍길동전 2), was released in 1995.
 Another South Korean animated feature film was released in 1995 with the title Doraon Yeongung Hong Gil-dong (돌아온 영웅 홍길동, "Returned Hero Hong Gildong").
 A platform game video game adaption of the 1995 animated feature film with the same title was released in December 1995 by LG for Windows.
 The 1995 South Korean role-playing video game The Romance of Forgotten Kingdom (망국전기~잊혀진 나라의 이야기, Mangguk Jeon'gi: Ichyeojin Nara-ui Iyagi) takes place in Yuldo, the country founded by Hong Gildong in the original story.
 The manhwa series Hong Gil-dong: Murim jeonsa rok (홍길동~무림전사록) by Oh Se-kwon (오세권) was started in 2004 and tells the story of Hong Gildong's return to Joseon in a fantasy world with cyberpunk elements.
 A character from Hong Gildong was also adapted in the Shin Agyo Onshi manga as female bandit leader.
 A South Korean TV series entitled Hong Gil-Dong, The Hero (a.k.a. Hong Gil-dong), first aired on January 2, 2008 on KBS2.
 A modern-day film adaptation named Descendants of Hong Gil-Dong was made in 2009.
 In the 2010 musical Hong Gil-dong, Sungmin and Yesung of Super Junior played the historical figure. It played at the Woori Financial Art Hall at the Olympic Park from 18 February 18 April 2010.
 In the Seoul Broadcasting System TV series Running Man, Haha played  'Ha Gil-dong' (an adaptation of Hong Gil-dong) in a special superheroes episode, broadcast on 12 October 2014.
 A comic action thriller, Phantom Detective, depicts a modern-day Hong Gil-dong as a detective.
2017 television series The Rebel starring Yoon Kyun-sang as Hong Gildong.
 In Overwatch, an alternate costume for the character Tracer is themed after Hong Gil-dong. This was produced for the 2019 Lunar New Year Event.
 Korean gacha video game Sid Story has female version of Hong Gil Dong in the game

Actors who played Hong Gil-dong
 Portrayed by Kang Ji-hwan and Lee In-sung in the 2008 KBS2 TV series Hong Gil-dong.
 Portrayed by Sungmin and Yesung in the 2010 musical Hong Gil-dong.
 Portrayed by Yoon Kyun-sang in the 2017 MBC TV series The Rebel.

English-language translations
 The Story of Hong Gildong, translated by Minsoo Kang. New York: Penguin, 2016. Based on the pilsa 89 manuscript. 
 The Story of Hong Gil Dong. Seoul: The Korean Classical Literature Institute (Baek AM Publishing Company), 2000. Bilingual edition based on the gyeongpan 30 manuscript.
 “The Tale of Hong Kiltong.” Translated by Marshall R. Pihl. In Anthology of Korean Literature: From Early Times to the Nineteenth Century, compiled and edited by Peter H. Lee. Honolulu: The University Press of Hawaii, 1981 (pp. 119–147). Based on the gyeongpan 24 manuscript.
 "Hong Kil Tong, The Adventures of an Abused Boy," translated by Horace Newton Allen. In  Korean Tales: Being a Collection of Stories Translated from the Korean Folk Lore. New York: G.P. Putnam's Sons, 1889. 170-93. Loosely translated, verging on a retelling.

Notes

External links
 Book: The Legend of Hong Gil dong 

 
Joseon dynasty works
Anonymity pseudonyms
Fictional Asian countries
Fictional gentleman thieves
Placeholder names
Fictional Korean people
Characters in Korean novels
Korean novels
Novels set in the Joseon dynasty